A United States teaching credential is a basic multiple or single subject credential obtained upon completion of a bachelor's degree, from a college or university that holds regional accreditation, and prescribed professional education requirements.  Teaching credentials are required in the United States in order to qualify to teach public school, as well as many other types of instruction.  Requirements vary from state to state.  Teachers in California must also pass the California Basic Educational Skills Test.

References

Professional titles and certifications
Teaching